Tong Yuanming (born April 21, 1972) is a Chinese IM-titled chess player. He was National Chess Champion in 1993.

Tong Yuanming plays for Bank of Qingdao chess club in the China Chess League (CCL).

See also
Chess in China

References

External links
Tong Yuanming - New In Chess. NICBase Online.
FIDE Chess Player card - Individual Calculations

Chessmetrics Career Ratings for Tong Yuanming
Elo rating with world rankings and historical development since 1990 (benoni.de/schach/elo) for Tong Yuanming

1972 births
Living people
Chess players from Jiangsu
Chess International Masters
People from Zhenjiang